Many people of European heritage in South Africa are descended from Huguenots. Most of these originally settled in the Cape Colony, but were absorbed into the Afrikaner and Afrikaans-speaking population, because they had religious similarities to the Dutch colonists.

Early arrivals

Even before the large-scale arrival of the Huguenots at the Cape of Good Hope in the 17th century, a small number of individual Huguenot refugees settled there. They included Francois Villion, later known as Viljoen, and the du Toit brothers. In fact, the first Huguenot to arrive at the Cape of Good Hope was Maria de la Quellerie, the wife of governor Jan van Riebeeck, who started the settlement at the Cape of Good Hope in 1652 on behalf of the Dutch East India Company; however, she and her husband left for Batavia after ten years.

After a commissioner was sent out from the Cape Colony in 1685 to attract more settlers, a more dedicated group of immigrants began to arrive. A larger number of French refugees began to arrive in the Cape after leaving their country as a result of the Edict of Fontainebleau (1685), which revoked the Edict of Nantes (1598) that had granted religious toleration to Protestants.

Mass migration
On 31 December 1687 a group of Huguenots set sail from France as the first of the large scale emigration of Huguenots to the Cape of Good Hope, which took place during 1688 and 1689. In total some 180 Huguenots from France, and 18 Walloons from present-day Belgium, eventually settled at the Cape of Good Hope. A notable example of this is the emigration of Huguenots from La Motte-d'Aigues in Provence, France. After this large scale emigration, individual Huguenot immigrant families arrived at the Cape of Good Hope as late as the first quarter of the 18th century, and the state-subsidised emigration of Huguenots was stopped in 1706.

This small body of immigrants had a marked influence on the character of the Dutch settlers. They were purposely spread out and given farms amongst the Dutch farmers. Owing to the policy instituted in 1701 of the Dutch East India Company which dictated that schools should teach exclusively in Dutch, that all official correspondence had to be done in Dutch, and strict laws of assembly, the Huguenots ceased by the middle of the 18th century to maintain a distinct identity, and the knowledge of French diminished and eventually disappeared as a home language. This assimilation into the colonial population was also due to the fact that many Huguenot descendants married individuals from the Dutch population.

Franschhoek

Many of these settlers were allocated farms in an area later called Franschhoek, Dutch for "French corner", in the present-day Western Cape province of South Africa. The valley was originally known as Olifantshoek ("Elephant's Corner"), so named because of the vast herds of elephants that roamed the area. The name of the area soon changed to le Coin Français ("the French Corner"), and later to Franschhoek, with many of the settlers naming their new farms after the areas in France from which they came. La Motte, La Cotte, Cabriere, Provence, Chamonix, Dieu Donne and La Dauphine were among some of the first established farms-—most of which still retain their original farm houses today.

Museum and monuments

A large monument to commemorate the arrival of the Huguenots in South Africa was inaugurated on 17 April 1948 at Franschhoek. A museum dedicated to the Huguenot history in South Africa is located adjacent to the monument.

A smaller monument commemorating the 300th anniversary of the arrival of the Huguenots is located in the Johannesburg Botanical Garden.

Voortrekkers
French Huguenot descendants were also included in the exodus of frontier farmers that was called the Great Trek.

Voortrekker surnames who were of French Huguenot ancestry include:

(Original French spelling in brackets)

Aucamp (Auchamp)
Boshof (Bossau)
Bruwer (Bruere)
Buys (Du Buis)
Cilliers (Cellier)
Cronje (Cronier)
De Klerk (Le Clercq)
Delport (Delporte)
De Villiers
Du Plessis
Du Preez (Des Prez, Des Pres, Du Pre)
du Randt (Durand)
du Toit
Duvenage (Duvinage)
Fouche (Foucher)
Fourie
Gous / Gouws (Gauch)
Hugo (Hugot, Hugod)
Jacobs (Jacob)
Jordaan (Jourdan)
Joubert (Jaubert)
Labuschagne (la Buscagne)
Le Roux
Lombard
Malan (Mallan)
Marais
Maartens/Martins (Martin)
Malherbe
Minnaar (Meinard, Mesnard)
Meyer
Naudé
Nel (Neel, Niel)
Nortier / Nortje (Nourtier)
Pienaar (Pinard)
Retief (Retif)
Reyneke? (Reyne?)
Riekert? (Richard?)
Rossouw (Rousseau)
Roux
Senekal (Senecal, Senechal)
Taljaard (Taillard)
Terblanche (Terreblanque)
Theron (Therond)
Tredoux
Viljoen (Villion)

Legacy

There are many families, today mostly Afrikaans-speaking, whose surnames bear witness to their Huguenot ancestry. A comprehensive list of these surnames can be seen on the Huguenot Memorial in the Johannesburg Botanical Garden. Examples of the more common names are Blignaut (Blignault), Cronje (Cronier), de Klerk (Le Clercq), Visagie (Visage), de Villiers, du Preez, du Plessis, du Toit, du Randt, Fourie, Fouche, Giliomee (Guilliaume), Gous / Gouws (Gauch), Hugo, Jacobs, Joubert, Jordaan (Jourdan), Labuschagne (la Buscagne), Lange, le Roux, Leonard, Lombard, Malan, Michel, Malherbe, Marais, Nel, Nortje (Nourtier), Pienaar, Retief, Rossouw, Roux, Terreblanche, Taljard, Theron and Viljoen (Villion).

Some of the descendants of these original Huguenot families became prominent figures in South African society, most notably F.W. de Klerk, the last State President of apartheid-era South Africa.

Some of the original forms of the surnames have been put in brackets.
 Aegidius Jean Blignaut, South African writer
George Christopher Cato (Caton) first mayor of Durban.
Jan F. E. Celliers, Afrikaans-language poet, essayist, dramatist and reviewer.
Sarel Cilliers, Voortrekker leader and a preacher.
Hansie Cronje cricketer
Piet Cronje leader of the Transvaal Republic's military forces during the First and Second Anglo-Boer Wars
F.W. de Klerk (born 18 March 1936; "Le Clerc"), last State President of apartheid-era South Africa.
Koos de la Rey, (Jacobus Herculaas de la Rey) (22 October 1847 – 15 September 1914) was a Boer general during the Second Boer War
Fanie de Villiers, former South African cricket player
AB de Villiers, former South African cricket player 
Rilee Rossouw Top class all rounder cricketer
Hempies du Toit, Springboks rugby player and winemaker 
Jean de Villiers, Springboks rugby player
Pieter de Villiers, South African athlete and Olympian (400m hurdles)
Faf du Plessis, South African cricketer
Morne du Plessis, Springboks rugby player
I. D. du Plessis, poet
Ampie du Preez, singer-songwriter
Frik du Preez ("du Prez"), Springboks rugby player, named as South Africa's rugby player of the 20th century
Max du Preez, journalist and author
Mignon du Preez, South African cricketer
Alexander du Toit, geologist
Daniel du Toit, South African astronomer
Christiaan du Toit, South African military commander
D. F. du Toit, co-founder of an Afrikaans language movement named the Society of Real Afrikaners
S. G. du Toit, co-founder of an Afrikaans language movement named the Society of Real Afrikaners
Wikus du Toit
Stephanus Jacobus du Toit, co-founder of an Afrikaans language movement named the Society of Real Afrikaners
Abraham Faure, (29 August 1795 – 28 March 1875) Cape clergyman and author
Jacobus Johannes Fouché, (6 June 1898, Wepener – 23 September 1980[1] Cape Town) served as the second President of South Africa from 1968 to 1975
Johnny Fourie, famous jazz guitarist.
Elsa Joubert, South African novelist in Afrikaans
Gideon Joubert, South African author and journalist Afrikaans science non-fiction author
Marius Joubert, Springboks rugby player
Petrus Jacobus Joubert, boer commandant-general of the South African Republic from 1880 to 1900
Piet Joubert
Ruda Landman
Frederick Le Roux, South African cricketer
Garth Le Roux, South African cricketer
Adolph Malan (1910–1963), known as Sailor Malan, Royal Air Force fighter pilot in the Second World War
Daniel François Malan, who was a Prime Minister of South Africa elected on apartheid platform
Magnus Malan, former South African Minister of Defence (in the cabinet of President P. W. Botha), Chief of the South African Defence Force (SADF) and Chief of the South African Army.
Rian Malan, celebrated South African author, journalist and political activist.
D. F. Malherbe, Afrikaans novelist
Gideon Malherbe, co-founder of an Afrikaans language movement named the Society of Real Afrikaners
Ben Marais
Eugene Marais
Sarie Marais
Beyers Naudé, Afrikaner anti apartheid cleric.
Charle-Pierre Naudé, poet
Jozua Naudé, acting President of South Africa from 1967 to 1968
Francois Pienaar, former Springboks rugby player; captain of the first Springboks team to win the Rugby World Cup in 1995
Piet Retief, boer voortrekker
Esta TerBlanche ("Terre-Blanche")
Eugène Terre'Blanche ("Terre-Blanche"), South African political activist and leader of AWB
Juan Theron, South African-born cricketer who has played both for the South African national cricket team and the United States national cricket team
Charlize Theron, Hollywood actress
Totius (Jakob Daniël du Toit) – poet
Constand Viljoen ("Villion"), former leader of the South African Freedom Front (1994–2001) and SADF general
Gerrit Viljoen
H.D Viljoen (Former Inspector General SADF)
Marais Viljoen
Paul Visagie, athlete and direct descendant of General Piet Joubert

Various French-language first names have also gained popularity amongst Afrikaners, examples being Francois, Jacques, Pierre, Charles, Jean-Pierre, Chantelle and Eugene.

Some Afrikaans writers have Huguenot surnames, and were involved in setting up the Society of Real Afrikaners.

The wine industry in South Africa was greatly influenced by the Huguenots, many of whose families had owned vineyards in France. Many of the farms in the Western Cape province in South Africa still bear French names, such as Haute Cabrière, La Petite Provence, La Bourgogne, La Motte, La Bri, La Borie, La Chataigne and La Roche.

See also
 Huguenot
 Huguenot Monument
 Huguenot Memorial Building
 History of Cape Colony
 Protestantism in South Africa
 White South Africans

References

Notes

Further reading
 Lugan, Bernard (1996). Ces Francais Qui Ont Fait L'Afrique Du Sud ("The French People Who Made South Africa"). Bartillat. .
 Weiss, M. Charles (1854). History of the French Protestant Refugees, from the Revocation of the Edict of Nantes to our own days. (Translated from the French by Henry William Herbert) New York: Stringer & Townsend.
 Memory and Identity: The Huguenots in France and the Atlantic Diaspora, Bertrand Van Ruymbeke & Randy J. Sparks, Published 2003 Univ of South Carolina Press, .
 The Huguenots of South Africa 1688–1988, Pieter Coertzen & Charles Fensham, Published 1988 Tafelberg, .
 .

External links
 The Huguenot Society of South Africa

Huguenot families
 Du Preez Family
 Roux Family
 Viljoen Family

History of South Africa
Ethnic groups in South Africa
 
French-South African culture
Lists of South African people
Dutch Cape Colony
Religion in the Dutch Empire
History of the Dutch East India Company